Old Flame is the seventh solo studio album by country rock singer Juice Newton.  It was released by RCA Records in November 1985.

Overview
Old Flame was recorded after Newton signed a new recording contract with RCA. It peaked at number 12 on the Billboard album chart.  In his review of the album music critic Thom Owens notes that "out of all of Juice Newton's albums, Old Flame has the strongest country roots and influences".  Featured on the album were cover versions of Del Shannon's "Cheap Love", Roy Hamilton's "Hurt", The Byrds's "Feel a Whole Lot Better" and Stealers Wheel's "Stuck in the Middle with You".

"You Make Me Want to Make You Mine", written for Newton by Dave Loggins, was the album's lead-off single and went to number one on the Billboard Country chart.  The song was her first top ten hit in three years.  This was followed by "Hurt" which also went to number one on Billboard's chart.  "Old Flame" and "Cheap Love", the next two singles to be released, peaked at number five and number nine, respectively. "What Can I Do with My Heart", the album's final single release was written by Newton's long-time collaborator Otha Young and also peaked at number nine.

"You Make Me Want to Make You Mine" earned Newton her fifth Grammy Award nomination for Best Female Vocalist. However, she lost to Rosanne Cash's "I Don't Know Why You Don't Want Me" - which was written by Cash in response to losing a Grammy to Newton in 1983.

"Both to Each Other (Friends & Lovers)", a duet by Newton and Eddie Rabbitt, was released as a single in July 1985 and peaked at number one.  This song was not included in the original release of Old Flame but was added to the vinyl, cassette, CD reissues.

Track listing

Personnel
Adapted from the AllMusic credits.

Juice Newton – guitar, vocals
Philip Aaberg – keyboards
Beth Andersen – background vocals
Susan Boyd – background vocals
Joe Chemay – background vocals
Donna Davidson – background vocals
George Doering – guitar
Gary Durrett – drums, background vocals
Kenny Edwards – background vocals
Andrew Gold – guitar, background vocals
Jim Haas – background vocals
Jon Joyce – background vocals
Robin Lamble – bass
Richard Landis – percussion, background vocals
Jim Lang – keyboards
Chuck Martin – guitar, soloist
Richard Page – background vocals
Alan Pasqua – organ, synthesizer
Timothy B. Schmit – background vocals
Tom Scott – saxophone, soloist
Rick Shlosser – drums
Neil Stubenhaus – bass
Fred Tackett – guitar

Charts

Weekly charts

Year-end charts

References

External links

1985 albums
Juice Newton albums
Albums produced by Richard Landis
RCA Records albums